Bonnie Lou Jensen (born October 11, 1938) is an American former missionary, international relations specialist, and director of the ELCA Global Mission.

Early life and education
Bonnie Lou Hagedorn was born in Royal, Iowa, and received degrees from Dana College and Wartburg Theological Seminary. She married American theologian Richard A. Jensen in 1957. Jensen moved to Addis Ababa, Ethiopia, to assist with the founding of the Mekane Yesus Seminary in 1962.

Career

Jensen served as executive director of the former American Lutheran Church Women (ALCW), Minneapolis, Minnesota from 1981 to 1987. From 1982 to 1987, Jensen and her husband, served as co-hosts of Reflections, a 30-minute Christian television series. From 1993 to 1995, Jensen served as director for planning and evaluation and program director for Papua New Guinea and the South Pacific for the Evangelical Lutheran Church in America.

ELCA Global Mission
Jensen became the director the ELCA Global Mission in 1995. Under her leadership in mission education, the ELCA companion synod program grew its relationships between the ELCA's 65 synods and Lutheran churches overseas. The ELCA's 8,894 congregations are organized into synods across the United States and Caribbean. Under her leadership the  ELCA Global Mission had a presence in 70 countries with 300 missionaries and volunteers, 47 division staff based, with annual expenditures of $29 million.

Jensen was also involved in Track II diplomacy, serving on the Lutheran World Federation (LWF) in Geneva, Switzerland during the 1980s, during this time the LWF had a NGO chair at the United Nations.

Personal life
In 1957, she married Richard A. Jensen. They had three children together, Doron, Dodi, and Derek.

Legacy
Jensen served on the board of Dana College and upon her retirement in 2003, she was awarded an honorary doctorate in divinity for her work in her field. She previously received an honorary doctorate from Wartburg Theological Seminary in 1997. She is noted as the first female to take leadership role within the ELCA and was one of the earliest feminist leaders in Lutheranism.

Honorary degrees

References

1939 births
Living people
Wartburg Theological Seminary alumni
Evangelical Lutheran Church in America Christians
Jensen family
Dana College alumni
People from Clay County, Iowa